Fever Dream (stylized in all caps) is the third studio album by Icelandic band Of Monsters and Men, released on 26 July 2019 through Republic Records. The album was co-produced by the band with Rich Costey, and was preceded by the lead single "Alligator".

Background
Lead singer Nanna Bryndís Hilmarsdóttir said that while writing the album she had grown "really tired" of writing songs on an acoustic guitar as it "brought out things in [me] that were predictable", so she began working on a laptop at home, "figuring out all these new sounds and being curious about them". Nanna said lead single "Alligator", called "driving and percussion-heavy" by Billboard, began like a "dance song", but that it is not entirely representative of the album's sound. She described the album as "more poppy and brighter" than the band's previous album, 2015's Beneath the Skin.

Critical reception

The album received positive reviews from music critics. It holds a rating of 70 on Metacritic, indicating "generally favorable" reviews.

Commercial performance
Fever Dream debuted at number nine on the US Billboard 200 with 34,000 album-equivalent units, of which 30,000 were pure album sales. It is Of Monsters and Men's third US top 10 album.

Track listing

Personnel
Of Monsters and Men
Nanna Bryndís Hilmarsdóttir – vocals (all tracks), guitar (1), synthesizer (1, 4–7, 10), samples (2, 4–6, 10), piano (3, 4), percussion (6), keyboards (8)
Ragnar Þórhallsson – vocals (1–3, 5–11), guitar (1, 5, 6, 11), piano (2, 5, 10), samples (2), synthesizer (5, 7, 9, 10), keyboards (8)
Brynjar Leifsson – guitar, synthesizer (1–3, 5–11); samples (2, 9, 10)
Kristján Páll Kristjánsson – bass (all tracks), synth bass (1), synthesizer (2, 5–7, 10, 11)
Arnar Rósenkranz Hilmarsson – drums, percussion (1–3, 5–11); programming (2, 5–8, 10, 11), samples (3, 7, 8, 10), synthesizer (3, 7–11), piano (11)

Additional musicians
 Steingrimur Karl Teague – piano (2, 4–6, 9)
 Rich Costey – programming (2, 5)
 Viktor Orri Árnason – strings (4, 10)
 Martin Cooke – programming (5, 8)

Technical
 Joe LaPorta – mastering
 Rich Costey – mixing
 Martin Cooke – engineering
 KT Pipal – mixing assistance

Artwork and design
 Davíð Arnar Baldursson – design, layout
 Ragnar Þórhallsson – design, layout
 Jón Sæmundur – paintings

Charts

Weekly charts

Year-end charts

References

2019 albums
Of Monsters and Men albums
Republic Records albums